Alan Rowlands (1 March 1929 – 2 January 2012) was an English pianist (though born in Swansea, Wales) who made notable contributions to British musical life both as a teacher and as a performer.

He obtained a degree in chemistry at Jesus College, Oxford, before winning a scholarship to study at the Royal College of Music (RCM) under Angus Morrison.

A particular preoccupation of his was the oeuvre of John Ireland. He studied much of Ireland's piano output with the composer himself, who recommended him to undertake a recording of the complete Ireland piano music. Rowlands completed the manuscript of Ireland's Ballade of London Nights, a piano piece composed in 1930. Rowlands first performed it on 6 June 1965.

For much of his life Rowlands taught at the RCM, from which he retired in 1999.

References

English classical pianists
Male classical pianists
1929 births
2012 deaths
Alumni of Jesus College, Oxford
20th-century classical pianists
20th-century English musicians
20th-century British male musicians